The Misano World Circuit (officially known as Misano World Circuit Marco Simoncelli or Misano Circuit Sic 58, and before 2006 called Circuito Internazionale Santa Monica) is a race track located next to the town of Misano Adriatico (Province of Rimini) in the frazione of Santa Monica-Cella.

As of 2007, it began hosting the San Marino and Rimini Coast Grand Prix as part of the MotoGP World Championship.

In 2012, the track was renamed to commemorate Marco Simoncelli, a local motorcycle racer who died in 2011.

History 

The circuit was designed in 1969; it was built from 1970 and 1972, and inaugurated that year. This version of the circuit hosted three editions of the San Marino motorcycle Grand Prix, from the 1985 season to the 1987 season. It was at Misano during the 1993 Italian Grand Prix that the defending 500 cc World Champion Wayne Rainey's career ended after he fell and suffered a broken spine. Between 1996 and 2001 all facilities were improved further, adding more pits and stands. In 2005, a new access point to the circuit was built, Via Daijiro Kato, in honor of the late Japanese rider, killed during the 2003 Japanese Grand Prix, whose in-season race home was in the Portoverde frazione of Misano Adriatico.

In order to host again the World motorcycle championship, the circuit was extensively modified in 2006. The first MotoGP race held on the circuit after the modifications was the 2007 San Marino and Rimini Coast Grand Prix, which was won by "home" marque Ducati.

During the 2010 Moto2 event, Japanese rider Shoya Tomizawa was killed after losing control of his bike and being subsequently struck by both Scott Redding and Alex de Angelis. Coincidentally this incident occurred 17 years to the day of Wayne Rainey's career ending incident also at Misano.

On 3 November 2011, the circuit owners announced that it would be named after Marco Simoncelli, an Italian motorcycle racer who died during the 2011 Malaysian Grand Prix in Sepang a week prior. Simoncelli was born in nearby Cattolica and had lived from childhood in Coriano. On 8 June 2012 the track's new name was confirmed at the San Marino round of the Superbike World Championship.

Events

 Current

 April: Ferrari Challenge Europe, [[:it: 
Campionato Italiano Velocità|CIV Superbike Championship]]
 May: European Truck Racing Championship Misano Grand Prix Truck, Italian GT Championship, TCR Italian Series, Italian F4 Championship, Porsche Carrera Cup Italia
 June: Superbike World Championship, Supersport World Championship, Supersport 300 World Championship
 July: GT World Challenge Europe, GT4 European Series, French F4 Championship, BOSS GP Peroni Race, CIV Superbike Championship, Porsche Sports Cup Deutschland
 September: Grand Prix motorcycle racing San Marino and Rimini Riviera motorcycle Grand Prix, MotoE World Championship Emilia Romagna and Rimini Riviera eRace
 October: Porsche Carrera Cup Italia Porsche Festival, Porsche Sports Cup Suisse

 Former

 Deutsche Tourenwagen Masters (2018–2019)
 Euroseries 3000 (1999–2000, 2005–2006, 2008)
 European Formula Two Championship (1973, 1975–1984)
 European Touring Car Championship (1986, 2000)
 Ferrari Challenge Finali Mondiali (2021)
 FIA European Formula 3 Championship (1980–1981, 1983)
 FIA Formula 3 European Championship (2018)
 FIA Sportscar Championship (1998)
 FIM Endurance World Championship (1977–1978, 1980)
 Formula Regional European Championship (2020)
 Formula Renault Eurocup (2006)
 Grand Prix motorcycle racing
 Emilia Romagna motorcycle Grand Prix (2020–2021)
 Italian motorcycle Grand Prix (1980, 1982, 1984, 1989–1991, 1993)
 GTR Euroseries (1998)
 Lamborghini Super Trofeo World Finals (2021)
 Sidecar World Championship (1990–1991, 1999–2003)
 Super Tourenwagen Cup (1999)
 TCR Europe Touring Car Series (2016)
 W Series (2019)
 World Sportscar Championship (1978)

Lap records 

The official fastest race lap records at the Misano World Circuit Marco Simoncelli are listed as:

References

External links 

 Official Homepage in English

Superbike World Championship circuits
Grand Prix motorcycle circuits
Motorsport venues in Italy